Borj (Arabic: البرج) is a municipality in the Akkar District of Lebanon. The town has a Köppen climate classification of Csa. There are nine Municipal Council members and one makhatir.

References

Populated places in Akkar Governorate
Akkar District
Mediterranean port cities and towns in Lebanon
Populated coastal places in Lebanon
Sunni Muslim communities in Lebanon